Heinrich Faber (before 1500 – 26 February 1552) was a German music theorist, composer, and Kantor.

Born in Lichtenfels, Bavaria, he was employed as a singer by Christian II of Denmark in Copenhagen, from 1515 to 1524. He later studied in Wittenberg, and is known to have lectured there, in 1551. He died in Oelsnitz.

He is known for several theoretical works, and for his beginners' textbook Compendiolum musicae of 1548, which was the most popular book in Lutheran schools during the 16th and 17th centuries, and is today an important source of two-voice compositions of the period.

The Heinrich-Faber Musikschule Lichtenfels – a musical school – is named after him.

Works
Compendiolum musicae (1548)
De musica poetica (1548)
Ad musicam practicam introductio (1550)

References

External links
 
 Heinrich-Faber Musikschule Lichtenfels 

15th-century births
1552 deaths
People from Lichtenfels, Bavaria
German classical composers
German music theorists
Renaissance composers
German male classical composers